Maurice Charlotin (born 6 December 1944) is a Haitian long-distance runner. He competed in the marathon at the 1972 Summer Olympics.

References

External links
 

1944 births
Living people
Athletes (track and field) at the 1971 Pan American Games
Athletes (track and field) at the 1972 Summer Olympics
Haitian male long-distance runners
Haitian male marathon runners
Olympic athletes of Haiti
Place of birth missing (living people)
Pan American Games competitors for Haiti